Ancylosis rhythmatica is a species of snout moth in the genus Ancylosis. It was described by Harrison Gray Dyar Jr. in 1914, and is known from Panama.

References

Moths described in 1914
rhythmatica
Moths of Central America